US Post Office-Dolgeville is a historic post office building located at Dolgeville in Herkimer County, New York, United States. It was built in 1939–1940, and is one of a number of post offices in New York State designed by the Office of the Supervising Architect of the Treasury Department, Louis A. Simon.   It is a one-story, five bay building with a granite clad foundation, brick facades laid in common bond, and limestone trim in the Colonial Revival style.  It features a slate-covered hipped roof on the front section.  The interior features a 1940 fresco by artist James Michael Newell titled "Underground Railroad."

It was listed on the National Register of Historic Places in 1988.

References

External links

Dolgeville
Government buildings completed in 1940
Colonial Revival architecture in New York (state)
Buildings and structures in Herkimer County, New York
National Register of Historic Places in Herkimer County, New York